Christopher Pierce may refer to:

 Chris Pierce, American musician
 Christopher Pierce (rower) (born 1942), British rower